Yaho is a town in the Yaho Department of Balé Province in south-western Burkina Faso. The town has a population of 3583 and is the capital of Yaho department.

References

Populated places in the Boucle du Mouhoun Region
Balé Province